.ni is the Internet country code top-level domain (ccTLD) for Nicaragua.

Second-level domains
Registrations are at the third level beneath several second-level names.  There are also a handful of sites directly at the second level, including the registry site itself at nic.ni. Second-level names include:

 .com.ni, Commercial entities
 .gob.ni, Government ministries and organizations
 .edu.ni, Educational entities and organizations
 .org.ni, Non-governmental entities and dependencies
 .nom.ni, Personal websites
 .net.ni, Network organizations
 .mil.ni, Military organizations
 .co.ni, Corporate entities from anywhere in the world
 .biz.ni, Commercial entities
 .int.ni, Organizations with international treaties
 .info.ni, Informational sites

References

External links
 IANA .ni whois information
 .ni registry

Country code top-level domains
Communications in Nicaragua

sv:Toppdomän#N